Berkeley Road railway station served the towns of Berkeley and Dursley in Gloucestershire, England.

History

The station was one of the first six stations built on the Bristol and Gloucester Railway, originally a broad gauge line overseen by Isambard Kingdom Brunel, but later taken over by the Midland Railway and converted to standard gauge. It was two miles east of Berkeley and three north-west of Dursley, and for the first year of its life it was called "Dursley and Berkeley Road". Dursley acquired a station of its own in 1856 with the opening of the Dursley and Midland Junction Railway branch from Coaley Junction.

In 1875, a branch line from Berkeley Road station was built to the new docks at Sharpness, passing around three quarters of a mile to the north of the town of Berkeley. The branch opened for goods traffic that year and to passenger services in 1876, with a station at Berkeley. In 1879 with the completion of the Severn Railway Bridge the Sharpness branch became a through-route to Lydney and the Forest of Dean.

As with the Stonehouse and Nailsworth Railway junction at Stonehouse (Bristol Road) railway station further up the Bristol and Gloucester line towards Gloucester, the actual junction for the Sharpness line was to the north of Berkeley Road station, and branch line trains departed from and arrived at a new set of platforms built at a tangent to the existing Brunel-designed station. The junction was controlled by a signalbox at the north end of the branch line up (towards Gloucester) platform.

Berkeley Road, like Stonehouse to the north and Mangotsfield to the south, was considered one of the more important stations on the Bristol and Gloucester line and some long-distance trains called there. The Sharpness branch, however, became less important and was reduced to single track in the 1930s. Damage to the Severn railway bridge in 1960 led the branch to cease being a through-route and passenger services were withdrawn in November 1964, though it remains open for some goods traffic.

Passenger services were withdrawn entirely from Berkeley Road in January 1965 with the withdrawal of stopping services on the Bristol to Gloucester line. Goods facilities at the station remained open to November 1966, except for a private siding which has since closed. The station structure came down after service ended. 

In November 2019, it was revealed that there were plans to reopen the station to serve two new garden villages nearby.

Services

References

Stroud District
Former Midland Railway stations
Disused railway stations in Gloucestershire
Railway stations in Great Britain opened in 1844
Railway stations in Great Britain closed in 1965
Beeching closures in England
Berkeley, Gloucestershire